Skyscraper Souls is a 1932 American pre-Code romantic drama film starring Warren William, Anita Page, Maureen O'Sullivan, Gregory Ratoff, and Verree Teasdale. Directed by Edgar Selwyn, it is based on the 1931 novel Skyscraper by Faith Baldwin.

Plot
The film portrays the aspirations, daily lives, and tragedies experienced by several people in the fictional 100-story Seacoast National Bank Building in Manhattan. Among them is David Dwight, the womanizing bank owner who keeps his estranged wife, Ella, happy by paying her bills. His secretary Sarah wants him to get a divorce so they can marry.

Cast

Reception and box office
Upon the release of Skyscraper Souls in the summer of 1932, The Film Daily, a widely read trade paper among movie-industry personnel and theater owners, gave the production a very positive review. The paper cited in particular the film's "swell cast" and the broad public appeal of its "fast-moving" plot, especially within the highly unstable environment of the United States' depressed economy at that time:

Mordaunt Hall, the respected film critic of The New York Times in 1932, also praised the storyline of Skyscraper Souls, calling it "a rich measure of entertainment" and "replete with suspense and vitality." However, the weekly trade paper Variety—also one of the more influential reviewers in the entertainment industry at the time—disagreed with The Film Daily and The New York Times regarding their positive opinions about the film's plot, although Variety  did give generally high marks as well to the cast's performances:

With regard to the film's "box office" or the number of theater-ticket buyers it attracted, Skyscraper Souls generated an appreciable profit for Cosmopolitan Productions and MGM. The film is reported to have earned $444,000 in the United States and Canada and $111,000 elsewhere, for an overall total of $555,000. Subtracting the film's reported budget of $382,000 from the cited gross derives a net profit on investment of $173,000.

References

External links
 
 

1932 films
1932 romantic drama films
Adultery in films
American romantic drama films
American black-and-white films
American business films
1930s English-language films
Films about businesspeople
Films based on American novels
Films based on romance novels
Films based on works by Faith Baldwin
Films directed by Edgar Selwyn
Films set in New York City
Metro-Goldwyn-Mayer films
1930s American films